Église Saint-Martin d'Erbajolo is a church in Erbajolo, Haute-Corse, Corsica. The building was classified as a Historic Monument in 1926.

References

Churches in Corsica
Monuments historiques of Corsica
Buildings and structures in Haute-Corse